Gaeta is the city and comune on the western coast of Italy.

Gaeta may also refer to:

Gulf of Gaeta, a body of water in the Tyrrhenian Sea named after the city.
Siege of Gaeta (disambiguation), any of five sieges of the city of Gaeta between 1707 and 1860.
Duke of Gaeta, a title of nobility associated with the city of Gaeta.
Gaeta, Queensland, a locality in the Bundaberg Region, Queensland, Australia

People 
 Antonio Gaeta (b. 1984), Italian footballer
 John Gaeta, American visual effects artist

Other 
Gaeta class minehunter, a class of eight minehunters operated by the Marina Militare (Italian Navy).
Felix Gaeta, a character from the 2004 science-fiction television series Battlestar Galactica.
Beansie Gaeta, a fictional character from the television series The Sopranos

Italian-language surnames